Wahlenbergia graniticola, commonly known as the granite bluebell, is a herbaceous plant in the family Campanulaceae native to eastern Australia.

It blooms throughout the year producing blue flowers.

The species is found in New South Wales, Queensland and Victoria.

References

graniticola
Flora of New South Wales
Flora of Victoria (Australia)
Flora of Queensland
Taxa named by Roger Charles Carolin
Plants described in 1965